, also written Ichiro, Ichirou or Ichiroh is a masculine Japanese given name. The name is occasionally given to the first-born son in a family.

Like many Japanese names, Ichirō can be written using different kanji characters and can mean: 
 一郎: "first son"
 一朗: "first clear, bright"

People with the name
, Japanese judoka
, Japanese general
 Ichiro Fujiyama (藤山 一郎, 1911–1993), a Japanese singer
, Japanese discus thrower
 Ichirō Hatoyama (鳩山 一郎, 1883–1959), a Japanese politician and the 52nd, 53rd, and 54th Prime Minister of Japan
, Japanese shogi player
, Japanese footballer
 Ichiro Ito (伊藤 一朗, born 1967), a Japanese rock guitarist
, Japanese diplomat, civil servant and politician
 Ichiro Miyake (三宅 市郎, 1881–1964), a Japanese mycologist
 Ichiro "Aniki" Mizuki (水木 一郎, 1948–2022), a Japanese vocalist 
 Ichiro Murakoshi (村越 伊知郎, born 1930), a Japanese voice actor
 Ichirō Nagai (永井 一郎, born 1931), a Japanese voice actor
 Ichiro Nakagawa (中川 一郎, 1925–1983), a Japanese politician from Hokkaidō
 Ichirō Ozawa (小沢 一郎, born 1942), a Japanese politician, and Secretary-General of the Democratic Party of Japan
, Japanese fencer
 Ichirō Shimada (島田 一郎, 1848–1878), an assassin of Ōkubo Toshimichi
 Ichiro Suzuki (鈴木 一朗, born 1973), a Japanese baseball outfielder
 Ichiro Suzuki (engineer) (鈴木 一郎, born 1937), a Japanese automobile engineer
 Ichiro Yamaguchi (山口 一郎, born 1980), a Japanese musician (sakanaction)
 Ichiro Yoshizawa (吉沢 一郎, 1903–1998), a Japanese mountaineer and expedition leader

Fictional characters
 Ichiro Ogami (大神 一郎), a character in Sakura Wars video game.
 Ichiro Miyata (宮田 一郎), a fictional character in the anime and manga series Fighting Spirit.
 Ichiro Tanaka, character from Medal of Honor: Rising Sun.
 Ichiro Yamada, character from John Okada’s No-No Boy.
 Ichiro Yamada (山田 一郎), a character in the Japanese multimedia series Hypnosis Mic: Division Rap Battle.

References

Japanese masculine given names